, son of Fusatsugu, was a kugyō or Japanese court noble of the Muromachi period (1336–1573). He held a regent position kampaku from 1479 to 1483. Konoe Hisamichi was his son.

References

Fujiwara clan
Konoe family
1445 births
1505 deaths